Sophie Devienne (1763–1841), was a French stage actress.

She was engaged at the Comédie-Française in 1786.

She became a Sociétaires of the Comédie-Française in 1786.

She retired in 1813.

References 

1763 births
1841 deaths
18th-century French actresses
French stage actresses